The american cockroach (Periplaneta americana) is the largest species of common cockroach, and often considered a pest. In certain regions of the U.S. it is colloquially known as the waterbug, though it is not a true waterbug since it is not aquatic. It is also known as the ship cockroach, kakerlac, and Bombay canary. It is often misidentified as a palmetto bug.

Despite their name, American cockroaches are native to Africa and the Middle East.  They are believed to have been introduced to the Americas only from the 17th century AD onward as a result of human commercial patterns, including the Atlantic slave trade.

Distribution 
Despite the name, none of the Periplaneta species is native to the Americas; P. americana was introduced to what is now the United States from Africa as early as 1625. They are now common in tropical climates because human activity has extended the insects' range of habitation, and are virtually cosmopolitan in distribution as a result of global commerce.

Biology

Characteristics
Of all common cockroach species, the American cockroach has the largest body size; molts 6–14 times (mostly 13 times) before metamorphosis; and has the longest life cycle, up to about 700 days.

They are reddish brown and have a yellowish margin on the pronotum, the body region behind the head. Immature cockroaches resemble adults except they are wingless.

The cockroach is divided into three sections; the body is flattened and broadly oval, with a shield-like pronotum covering its head. A pronotum is a plate-like structure that covers all or part of the dorsal surface of the thorax of certain insects. They also have chewing mouth parts, long, segmented antennae, and leathery fore wings with delicate hind wings. The third section of the cockroach is the abdomen.

The insect can travel quickly, often darting out of sight when a threat is perceived, and can fit into small cracks and under doors despite its fairly large size. It is considered one of the fastest running insects.

It has a pair of large compound eyes, each having over 3500 individual lenses (ommatidia, hexagonal apertures which provide a kind of vision known as the mosaic vision with more sensitivity but less resolution, being common during night, hence called nocturnal vision.) It is a very active night insect that shuns light.

American cockroach nymphs are capable of limb regeneration.

Morphology
The American cockroach shows a characteristic insect morphology with its body bearing divisions as head, trunk, and abdomen. The trunk, or thorax, is divisible into prothorax, mesothorax and metathorax. Each thoracic segment gives rise to a pair of walking appendages (known as cursorial legs). The organism bears two pairs of wings. The fore wings, known as tegmina, arise from mesothorax and are dark and opaque. The hind wings arise from the metathorax and are used in flight, though cockroaches rarely resort to flight. The abdomen is divisible into 10 segments, each of which is surrounded by chitinous exoskeleton plates called sclerites, including dorsal tergites, ventral sternites, and lateral pleurites.

Life cycle
American cockroaches have three developmental stages: egg, nymph, and adult. Females produce an egg case (ootheca) which protrudes from the tip of the abdomen. On average, females produce 9–10 oothecae, although they can sometimes produce as many as 90. After about two days, the egg cases are placed on a surface in a safe location. Immature cockroaches emerge from egg cases in 6–8 weeks and require 6–12 months to mature. After hatching, the nymphs feed and undergo a series of 13 moultings (or ecdysis). Adult cockroaches can live up to an additional year, during which females produce an average of 150 young. The American cockroach reproductive cycle can last up to 600 days.

Parthenogenesis
When female American cockroaches are housed in groups, this close association promotes facultative parthenogenic reproduction. The oothecae are produced asexually, without fertilization. The process by which the eggs are produced is automixis; during automixis, meiosis occurs, but instead of giving rise to haploid gametes as ordinarily happens, diploid gametes are produced (probably by terminal fusion of meiotic products) that can then develop into female cockroaches. Eggs produced by parthenogenesis have lower viability than eggs produced by sexual reproduction.

Genetics
The American cockroach genome is the second-largest insect genome on record, after Locusta migratoria. Around 60% of its genome is composed of repeat elements. Around 90% of the genome can be found in other members of Blattodea. The genome codes for a large number of chemoreceptor families, including 522 taste receptors and 154 olfactory receptors. The 522 taste receptors comprise the largest number found among insects for which genomes have been sequenced. About 329 of the taste receptors are involved in bitter taste perception. These traits, along with enlarged groups of genes relating to detoxification, the immune system, and growth and reproduction, are believed to be part of the reasons behind the cockroach's ability to adapt to human living spaces.

Diet
American cockroaches are omnivorous and opportunistic feeders that eat  materials such as cheese, beer, tea, leather, bakery products, starch in book bindings, manuscripts, glue, hair, flakes of dried skin, dead animals, plant materials, soiled clothing, and glossy paper with starch sizing. They are particularly fond of fermenting foods. They have also been observed to feed upon dead or wounded cockroaches of their own or other species.

Flight
In the immature (nymph) stage, American cockroaches are wingless and incapable of flight. Adults have useful wings and can fly for short distances. If they start from a high place, such as a tree, they can glide for some distance. However, despite their ability to do so, American cockroaches aren't regular fliers. They can run very fast and, when frightened, these insects more commonly scatter on foot.

Habitat
American cockroaches generally live in moist areas but can survive in dry areas if they have access to water. These cockroaches are common in basements, crawl spaces, cracks and crevices of porches, foundations, and walkways adjacent to buildings. In residential areas outside the tropics, these cockroaches live in basements and sewers and may move outdoors into yards during warm weather.

Relationship with humans

Risk to humans
The odorous secretions produced by American cockroaches can alter the flavor of food. Also, if populations of cockroaches are high, a strong concentration of this odorous secretion can be present. Cockroaches can pick up disease-causing bacteria, such as Salmonella, on their legs and later deposit them on foods and cause food poisoning or infection if they walk on the food. House dust containing cockroach feces and body parts can trigger allergic reactions and asthma in certain individuals. 

At least 22 species of pathogenic human bacteria, viruses, fungi, and protozoans, as well as five species of helminthic worms, have been isolated from field-collected P. americana (L.)

Control as pests

In cold climates, these cockroaches may move indoors, seeking warmer environments and food. Cockroaches may enter houses through sewer connections, under doors, or around plumbing, air ducts, or other openings in the foundation. Cockroach populations may be controlled through the use of insecticides. Covering any cracks or crevices through which cockroaches may enter and cleaning any spills or messes that have been made is beneficial, so cockroaches are not able to enter and are not attracted to the food source. Another way to prevent an infestation of cockroaches is to thoroughly check any material brought inside. Cockroaches and egg cases can be hidden inside or on furniture, in boxes, suitcases, grocery bags, etc.

Use in traditional Chinese medicine

The American cockroach has been used as an ingredient in traditional Chinese medicine, with references to its usage in the Compendium of Materia Medica and Shennong Ben Cao Jing. In China, an ethanol extract of the American cockroach, kang fu xin ye, is used as a prescribed drug for wound healing and tissue repair.

Comparison of three common cockroaches

Notes

References

External links

 An Ohio State University Entomology article on the American cockroach (PDF)
 Friday Fellow: American Cockroach at Earthling Nature
 Gallery of cockroaches
 Order Blattodea, Exploring California Insects
 University of Minnesota Extension - Cockroaches article
 American cockroach egg parasitoid on the UF/IFAS Featured Creatures website

Cockroaches
Household pest insects
Cockroaches described in 1758
Articles containing video clips
Taxa named by Carl Linnaeus